The William Barret House, located at 15 South 5th Street, Richmond, Virginia, is a mid-19th-century house, and has been listed on the National Register of Historic Places since 1972 (building listing #72001517)

History

William Barret (29 November 1786 – 20 January 1871), a wealthy tobacconist in antebellum Richmond, built the Classical Revival styled house, in 1844, in Richmond's up-and-coming Gamble's Hill neighborhood.  The house is situated on the southeast corner lot of 5th and Cary Streets.  The residence and its dependencies survived the Richmond evacuation fire (April 2–3, 1865) at the end of the American Civil War, and remain largely intact, today.

Since it ceased use as a private residence, the Barret House has been used by a variety of organizations and for various purposes.  The Navy League Club used it as a social club for sailors during the Second World War, and it later served as the offices for the Virginia Society of the American Institute of Architects Virginia Foundation for Architecture (now the Virginia Center for Architecture) and an antique book store — all which relocated in 2005 to Branch House on Monument Avenue.

Since 2009, Barret House has served as the corporate headquarters of Thompson Davis & Company, an asset management firm.

References

External links
William Barret House, Fifth & Cary Streets, Richmond, Independent City, VA: 2 photos at Historic American Buildings Survey

Historic American Buildings Survey in Virginia
Houses on the National Register of Historic Places in Virginia
Greek Revival houses in Virginia
Houses completed in 1844
Houses in Richmond, Virginia
National Register of Historic Places in Richmond, Virginia